Benedict Navaratne (1916 – 9 June 1979) was a cricketer who kept wicket for Ceylon in first-class cricket from 1940 to 1952.

He toured with the Ceylon team to India in 1940-41 and Pakistan in 1949-50. He had a reputation for standing up to the stumps to all but the fastest bowlers. His obituary in the 1980 Wisden, shortly before Sri Lanka achieved Test status, called him "Sri Lanka's greatest wicket-keeper".

Playing in a one-day match against the touring Australian team in early 1948, Navaratne's keeping earned high praise from the visitors. Sir Donald Bradman is reported to have said that he would like to have Navaratne in his team.

References

External links

1916 births
1979 deaths
Alumni of St. Benedict's College, Colombo
Alumni of Zahira College, Colombo
Sinhalese Sports Club cricketers
Sri Lankan cricketers
All-Ceylon cricketers
Wicket-keepers